Cristina Dinu and Lina Gjorcheska were the defending champions but chose not to participate.

Irina Khromacheva and Diana Shnaider won the title, defeating Tamara Čurović and Chiara Scholl in the final, 6–2, 6–3.

Seeds

Draw

Draw

References

External Links
Main Draw

Ladies Open Hechingen - Doubles
2022 Doubles